The state of California offers online learning for grades 9–12. Over 56,000 of students are taking one or more online classes in California, according to the reports California Department of Education. There are two types of online high school available in California.

1.Private Online High School

San Diego Virtual School
EPGY Online High School
Laurel Springs School
Forest Trail Academy
Halstrom High School Online
National University Virtual High School
Orange Lutheran High School Online
Global Village School
Sycamore Academy
Allied High School
North Star Academy
The Keystone School
James Madison High School
Excel High School
Penn Foster High School
K12 International Academy
National High School
Apex Learning Virtual School

2.Public Online High School
Sage Oak Charter Schools
California Virtual Academies
Choice 2000 Online High School
New Day Academy
Insight School of California
Ocean Grove Charter School
South Sutter Charter School
Oak Knoll Virtual Academy
Pacific View Charter School
Delta Pacific Online School
iHigh Virtual Academy
Dunlap Leadership Academy
iQ Academy California
Riverside Virtual School

References

Alternative education
Distance education institutions based in the United States
Educational technology
Education in California